The 1913–14 Scottish Division One season was won by Celtic by six points over nearest rival Rangers.

League table

Results

References

1913–14 Scottish Football League
Scottish Division One seasons
Scottish